Edward Franklin Albee II (October 8, 1857 – March 11, 1930) was an American vaudeville impresario.

Early life
Albee was born on October 8, 1857 in Machias, Maine to Nathaniel Smith Albee and Amanda Higgins Crocker.

Career

He toured with P. T. Barnum as a roustabout, then, in 1885, he partnered with Benjamin Franklin Keith in operating the Bijou Theatre in Boston, Massachusetts. With the success of their business, it grew into the Keith-Albee theatre circuit of vaudeville theatres. Albee gradually took managerial control of Keith's theatrical circuit. They were the first to introduce moving pictures in the United States.

In 1900, Pat Shea of Buffalo proposed to Keith and Albee that they should set up a shared booking arrangement for vaudeville similar to the Theatrical Syndicate. They called a meeting in May 1900 in Boston of most of the major vaudeville managers, including Weber & Fields, Tony Pastor, Hyde & Behman of Brooklyn, Kohl & Castle, Colonel J.D. Hopkins, and Meyerfield & Beck of the Orpheum Circuit of the western United States. 

They did not invite Frederick Freeman Proctor, Keith's main competitor, but the other managers objected and insisted on a meeting in New York where Proctor was invited. The Vaudeville Managers Association (VMA) was founded at the New York meeting. Keith and Albee dominated the new organization.  Albee was president of the VMA's United Bookings Office from its formation in 1906. Albee had most of the major vaudeville circuits give him control of their theatrical bookings where he charged acts a 5% commission.

When performers tried to form a union, he set up National Vaudeville Artists and made membership in it a requirement for booking through his company. His partner Keith died in Palm Beach, Florida in 1914.

He formed the Keith-Albee-Orpheum corporation on January 28, 1928 with Joseph P. Kennedy.  Radio Corporation of America bought his company and formed RKO Pictures ("Radio-Keith-Orpheum") and turned the Orpheum vaudeville circuit into a chain of movie theaters.

Anecdotes
Many entertainers considered Albee's tactics tyrannical. Groucho Marx referred to the United Bookings Office as "Albee's Gestapo".

Joe Frisco summed up the impression of power Albee made; exiting Albee's office into a street under construction, his agent wondered why the street was being torn up and Frisco quipped, "Albee's kid lost his ball."

Albee appears as a minor character in the film Yankee Doodle Dandy and in the 1968 Broadway musical, George M!.

Personal life
Albee married Lauretta Frances Smith (1861–1960), with whom he had:
Albee (d. 1916)
Edward Albee (1883–1883), who died young
Reed A. Albee (1886–1961), who married Louise Holmes Williams, an actress, in 1914. They divorced in 1925 and in the same year, he married Frances Cotter.
Ethel Keith Albee (1890–1976), who married Edwin George Lauder Jr. (1883–1955) in 1914. They divorced in 1941.

On March 11, 1930, Albee died at the Breakers Hotel in Palm Beach, Florida. He was buried at Kensico Cemetery in Valhalla, New York. In his will, his estate was valued in excess of $2,000,000 (equivalent to $ in ) and he left his wife $1,000,000 (equivalent to $ in ), among many charitable donations that supported The Actors' Fund, Percy Williams Home, Variety Artists' Benevolent Fund and Institution.

Descendants
His grandson was Edward Albee (1928–2016), the playwright, who was adopted by his son, Reed.

See also
 with Albees in Manhattan

Albee Square

References

Further reading
New York Times; March 16, 1930. THRONG AT FUNERAL OF EDWARD F. ALBEE; Notables of Stage and Other Fields at Services in Cathedral of St. John.BISHOP MANNING PRESIDES Cathedral Clergy Assist in Impressive Requlem—700 Theatres Pay Tribute to Former Head. The Honorary Pallbearers. Some of Those Present. Tribute at 700 Theatres. Vaudeville stars, old-time luminaries of the stage, vaudeville executives from cities far West as Chicago, people connected in every conceivable way with the stage and many others paid homage yesterday morning to Edward F. Albee, former ...
Time; June 8, 1931. But the [National Variety Artists' Club in West 46th Street in Manhattan] club has always run an annual deficit. For years Edward Franklin Albee variety tycoon (Keith-Albee), footed the losses until his death in 1930."

1857 births
1930 deaths
Vaudeville producers
People from Machias, Maine
Burials at Kensico Cemetery
People from Larchmont, New York